Calvadosia is a genus of stalked jellyfish in the order Stauromedusae. It is the only genus in the monotypic family Kishinouyeidae.

Taxonomy and systematics
The family name is a tribute to Japanese cnidariologist Kamakichi Kishinouye. Mayer used the synonym Kishinouyea as a replacement name of Schizodiscus, for homonymy, as the name was already used to describe a lichen genus. Kishinouyea was also used by Yoshio Ôuchi to describe a praying mantis genus that he quickly renamed Kishinouyeum in 1938, and that could be a junior synonym for Phyllothelys.

Species
The following species are recognized in the genus Calvadosia:

 Calvadosia campanulata (Lamouroux, 1815)
 Calvadosia capensis (Carlgren, 1938)
 Calvadosia corbini (Larson, 1980)
 Calvadosia cruciformis (Okubo, 1917)
 Calvadosia cruxmelitensis (Corbin, 1978)
 Calvadosia hawaiiensis (Edmondson, 1930)
 Calvadosia lewisi Miranda, Branch, Collins, Hirano, Marques & Griffiths, 2017
 Calvadosia tasmaniensis (Zagal, Hirano, Mills, Edgar & Barrett, 2011)
 Calvadosia tsingtaoensis (Ling, 1937)
 Calvadosia vanhoeffeni (Browne, 1910)

References

  Synopsis of the medusae of the world. Kramp, P. L., 1961, Journal of the Marine Biological Association of the United Kingdom, vol. 40, Page(s): 1-469    
 The systematic position of the Stauromedusae. Uchida, Tohru, 1973, Publications of the Seto Marine Biological Laboratory, vol. 20, Page(s): 133-139

External links

Kishinouyeidae
Medusozoa genera